Test Icicles were a short-lived rock band that formed in England, primarily influenced by post-hardcore, dance-punk and indie rock but containing musical elements from a variety of genres (notably dance, hip hop, crossover thrash, and punk). The band was formed in 2004 by Rory Attwell and Sam Mehran, who were later joined by Devonte Hynes. Hynes and Mehran were both 18 years old at the time of the band's inception. The group has since become notable due to the later success of its members.

History 

Prior to forming the band, Atwell, Hynes and Mehran (all of whom shared vocal and guitar duties) had met each other through mutual friends. The trio's preference for the same nightspots (such as the Afterskool night club, in London) also led to frequent meet-ups. Initially the band formed under the moniker Balls with Ferry Gouw, who shortly after went on to form Semifinalists, effectively in the role Hynes eventually filled. Gouw left the band for an extended trip to Indonesia, at which time Attwell and Mehran recruited Hynes and changed the band name to Test Icicles, the new band name also being a suggestion from Gouw.

All three members of the group were involved in numerous, short-lived musical projects before the forming of Test Icicles.

Split 
In February 2006, the band announced they were splitting up.

On 26 April 2006 the band released Dig Your Own Grave, an EP meant as a farewell from the band. It featured a CD with remixes and unreleased tracks, and a DVD with the band's music videos.

Post-Test Icicles 
After the band split, the individual members continued to stay active, becoming involved in a number of side projects between them.

Mehran was believed to have moved back to America after the split and claimed to have been spotted working in a record store in New York. 

In July 2018, Mehran was found dead in his Hollywood home due to suicide, just after completing work on a planned solo album. Hynes paid tribute to him on Instagram, saying, “Every time I was with you we were 17 again. You were such a gift to this world. The floor has gone and I don’t know where to stand. RIP.”

Members
 Rory Attwell (aka Raary Deci-hells, Raary Rambert RAT ATT AGG, Rory Brattwell) English (born in London, England)  — guitar and vocals
 Sam Mehran (aka Sam E Danger, Sam E Slaughter) American (born in Miami, moved to Adelaide, Australia, then to New York City before moving to England) — vocals and guitar (died July 2018)
 Devonté Hynes (aka Dev Metal, !Ved) English (born in London, England) — guitar, keyboards and vocals

Touring members
 Adam Bainbridge (aka DJ Jitset) English (Born in Peterborough, England) — DJ

Equipment
 Rory Attwell (Guitars - Wilson Bros. Venture VM-75, Fender '72 Deluxe Telecaster)
 Devonté Hynes (Guitars - Squier HH Showmaster (hot pink), Aria II Pro ZZ Deluxe, and in earlier shows, he used a Telecaster copy).
 Sam Mehran (Guitars - Les Paul Deluxe copy, Peavey Raptor)

Amps - All three of the members would switch guitar duties, usually sharing the same amps. They usually used a Peavey Valveking 1x12, a small Trace Elliot combo, or a Fender Hot Rod deluxe.

Keyboard - Dev used a Korg Microkorg.

Effects - It is hard to see which effects they used, but one picture shows an Electro Harmonix WORM modulation pedal, which is probably responsible for the ring modulation effect in the song "Boa vs. Python". In an interview they claimed to use the same effects as nu-metal group KoЯn.

Discography

Studio albums
 For Screening Purposes Only (31 October 2005) #69 UK

Singles and EPs

Demos
 "4 Track Demo" (July 2004)

References

External links 
 Farewell gig review on Sound Generator
 Coverage in NME
 "Band of the Day: Test Icicles", Spin, 2 November 2005
 Interview on XFM

Videos 
 YouTube - Circle Square Triangle music video
 YouTube - What's Your Damage music video
 PUNKCAST #836 - video of Test Icicles' first U.S. show at Sin-é, New York City, on 15 September 2005
 BBC - Test Icicles session video and interview
 YouTube demon(sic) Insanity Problem music video

Musical groups established in 2004
Musical groups disestablished in 2006
English indie rock groups
Dance-punk musical groups
Domino Recording Company artists
2004 establishments in England
2006 disestablishments in England